Gladstone William Perry (April 3, 1880 – October 2, 1967) was a Canadian politician. He served in the Legislative Assembly of New Brunswick as member of the Progressive Conservative party from 1931 to 1952.

References

1880 births
1967 deaths
Progressive Conservative Party of New Brunswick MLAs